Pierozzi is a surname of Italian origin. Notable people with the surname include:

 Antonio Pierozzi, a saint by the Catholic Church
 Caterina Angela Pierozzi, an Italian painter active in Florence
 Edoardo Pierozzi, an Italian football player
 Giuseppe Pierozzi, an Italian stage and film actor
 Orazio Pierozzi, a World War I flying ace

See also
 Piero (disambiguation)

Surnames of Italian origin